Phani Mukut Rai  was a legendary Nagvanshi king. According to the Nagvanshi tradition, he was first Nagvanshi king and founder of Nagvanshi dynasty in 1st century CE. However the story of Phani Mukut Rai is considered a myth by histrorian and scholar date the establishment of the Nagvanshi dynasty around 4th century CE.

Early life
According to Nagvanshavali (1876), Phani Mukut Rai was son of Pundarika Naga a Naga and Parvati, a Sakaldwipiya Brahmin girl from Varanasi. Pundarika Naga the son of Takshaka settled in Varanasi after Janamejaya the Kuru king expelled Naga from Taxila. He studied scriptures in house of a Sakaldwipiya Brahmin by pretending to be a Brahmin and married his daughter. Due to his forked tongue, he always slept with his back to his wife. The poisonous breath regularly came out from his mouth. Wife becomes curious to know about the secret but Pundrika Naga never told the secret. They traveled to Jagannath temple of Puri for pilgrimage. During return from pilgrimage, his wife felt birth pain and about to die. She wish to know his secret. Then Pundrika Naga turned into a cobra, told his secret and plung into pond. His wife Parvati committed Sati out of grief after giving birth to a child. Pundrika Naga gave shed to child with his hood. Woodcutter saw it and informed a Sakaldwipiya Brahmin name Janardan who was holding sun idol. Brahmin saw the incident. Pundrika Naga told his story to Brahmin and told Brahmin that the boy will become king of Nagpur and Brahmin will become his priest. Brahmin named the child Phani Mukut Rai as he was protected by hood of Cobra and brought up him. Brahmin was holding Sun idol which became tutelary deity of Nagvanshi as suggested by Pundrika Naga. Brahmin was priest of Madura Munda, the chief of Sutiambe village. Later Madra Munda and other king such as King of Suguja and Aditya king of Patkum elected Phani Mukut Rai as King due to his qualities. According to Nagvanshi tradition it happened in 104 CE. However the story is mostly considered a myth and a story of Brahminacal origin of dynasty invented in later period.

According to report by Webster, the Kanyabuja Brahmin raised the Phani Mukut Rai. But According to story collected by Sarat Chandra Roy, the child was adopted by Madra Munda, the parha chief of Sutiambe village.

Chieftaincy
According to Nagvanshi tradition, Phani Mukut Rai was elected as Raja by Parha chief and other Rajas of Suguja and Phatkum due to his qualities around 94 AD and He ruled for 68 years. His capital was at Sutiambe which is now located in Ranchi district. He resided in mud fort. During his reign, he defeated Rakshel of Korambe and invaders from Kendujhar with the help of king of Panchet. His rule was extended to Badin of Kharsawan, Ramgarh, Gola, Tori and Gharwe. He built sun temple in Suitabe. He invited Panda from Puri and established idols in thakurbadi. He established Brahmin by giving them village of Sornda and Mahugaon. During his reign several people came from different parts of country. His Diwan was Srivastav Kayasth, Pandey Bhav Rai a resident of Belkupi village. According to writer of book "Nagvansh", Lal Praduman Singh, during the reign of Phani Mukut Rai, there were 66 pargana in Nagvanshi kingdom of which 22 were in Ghatwa, 18 in Khukhragarh, 18 in Doisagarh and 8 in Jarichgarh.

However the remains of the idol of the Sun temple near Pithoria  have been dated to the 12th Century CE. There is no archeological remains discovered to validate the story of Phani Mukut Rai. Many scholar put the date of establishment of Nagvanshi dynasty in 4th century CE taking into account of  average ruling period of 25 years for each king.

According to genology given by Dripnath Shah to governor general of India in 1787, Phani Mukut Rai was first Nagvanshi king who was son of Pundarik Naga and Sakaldwipiya Brahmin girl Parvati. The story of Phani Mukut Rai is considered to be a myth by scholars.

Personal life
According to Nagvanshavali, there was arises difficulties when Phani Mukut Rai wanted to marry princess of Panchet. The priest of Panchet arrived to check certificate of birth and not found. Then the Phani Mukut Rai prayed his serpent father that if the priest not satisfied, then the Munda or Oraon girl should be queen of Nagpur. Then Once again Pundrika Naga appeared and told the story and Brahmin satisfied.
Then he married the daughter of Govanshi Raja of Panchet.

References

Asian kings
Nagpuria people